Show World is an album by rock band Redd Kross, released in 1997.

Three singles were issued in the UK: "Get Out of Myself", "Mess Around", and "Secret Life". The US promotional singles were "Stoned", "Get Out of Myself", and "Mess Around".

Critical reception
AllMusic called the album "yet more fun from a band who dedicates themselves to a smart good time." Entertainment Weekly wrote that "in the hands of Redd Kross, bubblegum, glam, and old-school Brit pop sound thoroughly modern and, well, absolutely groovy."

Track listing
"Pretty Please Me" (cover of song by The Quick)
"Stoned"
"You Lied Again"
"Girl God"
"Mess Around"
"One Chord Progression"
"Teen Competition"
"Follow The Leader"
"Vanity Mirror"
"Secret Life"
"Ugly Town"
"Get Out Of Myself"
"Kiss The Goat"
"Sick Love" (hidden track)

Personnel
Vicki Berndt – photography
Marina Chavez – photography
Nick DiDia – engineer
John Ewing, Jr. – engineer
Gere Fennelly – keyboards
Brian Kehew – engineer, string arrangements
Eddie Kurdziel – guitar
Jeff McDonald – guitar, vocals
Steve McDonald - bass
David Nottingham – engineer
Redd Kross – producer
Brian Reitzell – percussion, drums
Steve Rooke – mastering
Tannis Root – design
Chris Shaw – producer, engineer, mixing

References

1997 albums
Redd Kross albums